Woodford is an unincorporated community in Woodford County, Illinois, United States.

The community takes its name after Woodford County.

References

Unincorporated communities in Woodford County, Illinois
Unincorporated communities in Illinois
Peoria metropolitan area, Illinois